The South African Confederation of Labour (SACOL) was a national trade union federation of white workers in South Africa.

History
The federation was established in 1957, as a loose body bringing together the South African Federation of Trade Unions, the Co-ordinating Council of South African Trade Unions, the Federal Consultative Council of South African Railways and Harbours Staff Associations, and the Trade Union Council of South Africa (TUCSA).  TUCSA withdrew in 1958, and the remaining federation was broadly supportive of apartheid.

In 1968, the federation decided to permit individual unions to affiliate.  These unions gradually came to operate on an equal footing to the remaining affiliated federations, and this led the Federal Consultative Council to disaffiliate in 1975, although all but one of its own affiliates decided to sign up individually to SACOL.  This took the federation's membership to a maximum of 25 unions with 206,511 members.

While the Government of South Africa allowed unions to represent both white and "coloured" workers, and from 1980, black workers as well, SACOL only permitted unions restricted to white workers to affiliate.  In 1980, it expelled the South African Technical Officials' Association, after it permitted coloured workers to join, and this led some other affiliates to resign in order to expand their own membership.  Membership of the federation then fell steadily.  In 1992, its largest remaining affiliate, the Mine Workers' Union, disaffiliated in order to become a general union.  The federation was reduced to only five affiliates with 40,280 members.

Affiliates

References

Apartheid in South Africa
National trade union centres of South Africa
Trade unions established in 1957